Retslægerådet ("the council of coroners") is a Danish institution under the Ministry of Justice (Denmark). Its job is to guide the authority body on medical questions in legal cases. The council advised up to 2000 times in 2006. Most of their cases are about psychiatry.

External links 
 Composition
 Homepage
 Annual report since 1988

Sources 

Jurisprudence